John Nygren (born February 27, 1964) is an American insurance and financial services agent, politician, and lobbyist.  A Republican, he was a member of the Wisconsin State Assembly for nearly 14 years, serving from January 2007 to December 2020.  He was co-chair of the powerful Joint Finance Committee from 2013 until his sudden resignation on December 1, 2020.  He now works as executive director for the Wisconsin Association of Health Plans, a state lobbying organization for health insurance companies.  Prior to holding public office, he was President of the United States Junior Chamber youth organization.

Early life and career
Nygren is a fourth generation resident of northeast Wisconsin. He graduated from Marinette High School in 1982, studied at the University of Wisconsin-Marinette, and worked in the restaurant industry for over 12 years, eventually becoming co-owner/operator of his own establishment. In 1998 he started work at Great Lakes Financial Management Group selling insurance and other financial services.

Nygren was involved with the Jaycees, serving as Marinette's chapter president, the regional director for Northeast Wisconsin, Wisconsin state president, and United States national president.

Political career
Nygren was chairman of the Marinette County Republican Party and served on the City of Marinette Recreation and Planning Board from 2003 to 2006.  In 2006, Nygren ran for Wisconsin State Assembly to replace Speaker John Gard, who was vacating his Assembly seat to run for United States House of Representatives.  Nygren narrowly won the Republican primary election, defeating former state senator Gary Drzewiecki by just 37 votes.  Nygren went on to defeat Democrat Randy Koehn in the November general election with 54% of the vote.

In the Assembly, he was assigned to the standing committees on Insurance; on Education, Health and Health care reform; and on Jobs and the Economy.

Nygren was re-elected seven times, facing a Democratic opponent in six of the seven general elections.  After the 2011 redistricting, Nygren's district became more safely Republican, and he did not receive less than 59% in any election after redistricting.

2011 recall elections
In 2011, a recall campaign was initiated by Democrats, resulting from the upheaval over the Budget Repair bill.  Republicans retaliated by launching their own recall effort, targeting Democratic state senators.  One of the senators who was successfully pulled into a recall was Democrat Dave Hansen.  Nygren, who lived in his district, sought to challenge him in the recall election.  However, the Wisconsin Government Accountability Board ruled that he was two signatures short of the necessary 400 signatures on his nomination petition, and thus his name would not appear on the ballot.

Resignation
Nygren won a substantial victory in 2020 with 68% of the vote.  However, only a month after the election, Nygren announced he would immediately resign his seat.  Governor Tony Evers announced he would call a special election to fill the vacancy.  On December 14, it was announced that Nygren would work as executive director at the Wisconsin Association of Health Plans, a lobbying group for health insurers.

Personal life
Nygren is married to Maggie, a family and consumer education teacher at Marinette High School, and they have three children; Cassie, Cali and Colin. The Nygren family is active at Faith Lutheran Church. John serves as church elder, and previously spent four years as church president.

In January 2020, Nygren's daughter, Cassie, was found guilty of being a party to a first-degree reckless homicide stemming from the death of a pregnant woman to whom she sold drugs.

Electoral history

Wisconsin Assembly (2006, 2008, 2010, 2012)

| colspan="6" style="text-align:center;background-color: #e9e9e9;"| Republican Primary, September 12, 2006

| colspan="6" style="text-align:center;background-color: #e9e9e9;"| General Election, November 7, 2006

| colspan="6" style="text-align:center;background-color: #e9e9e9;"| General Election, November 4, 2008

| colspan="6" style="text-align:center;background-color: #e9e9e9;"| General Election, November 2, 2010

| colspan="6" style="text-align:center;background-color: #e9e9e9;"| General Election, November 6, 2012

Wisconsin Assembly (2014, 2016, 2018, 2020)

| colspan="6" style="text-align:center;background-color: #e9e9e9;"| General Election, November 8, 2016

| colspan="6" style="text-align:center;background-color: #e9e9e9;"| General Election, November 6, 2018

| colspan="6" style="text-align:center;background-color: #e9e9e9;"| General Election, November 3, 2020

References

External links
 
 
 Official website
 Campaign website
 Representative John Nygren at Wisconsin Legislature
 Wisconsin Association of Health Plans

1964 births
American Lutherans
Living people
Lutherans from Wisconsin
Republican Party members of the Wisconsin State Assembly
People from Marinette, Wisconsin
American restaurateurs
Businesspeople from Wisconsin
21st-century American politicians